Raghu Karnad is an Indian journalist and writer, and a recipient of the Windham–Campbell Literature Prize for Non-Fiction. He is a 2022-'23 fellow at the Dorothy and Lewis B. Cullman Center for Scholars and Writers at the New York Public Library. His book, Farthest Field: An Indian Story of the Second World War, was awarded the Sahitya Akademi Yuva Puraskar for a writer in English in 2016, and shortlisted for the Hessell-Tiltman Prize in the same year. His articles and essays have won international awards including the Lorenzo Natali Journalism Prize in 2008, the Press Institute of India National Award for Reporting on the Victims of Armed Conflict in 2008, and a prize from the inaugural Financial Times-Bodley Head Essay Competition in 2012.

Karnad was previously the editor of Time Out Delhi. He is the son of late Girish Karnad. He has also contributed articles to The New Yorker, The Atlantic, Granta and The Guardian. In 2015, he was part of the founding team of The Wire (India), and later held the position of Chief of Bureau in New Delhi.

He was a student at Swarthmore College, and he spent a semester at the American University of Cairo and managed to get a meeting with Yassar Arafat. In 2019, he was one of the writers invited to the Neilson Hays Bangkok Literature Festival.

Bibliography

References

External links
 Review of Farthest Field by John Keay on Literary Review
 Interview on NPR

Year of birth missing (living people)
Parsi people
21st-century Indian journalists
Living people